Maxillaria vitelliniflora, the yolk-yellow flower maxillaria, is a species of orchid ranging from Brazil to Argentina (Misiones).

References

External links 

vitelliniflora
Orchids of Argentina
Flora of Misiones Province
Orchids of Brazil